For the Future may refer to:
 For the Future (song), a 2005 song by Do As Infinity
 For the Future (political party), a political party in Ukraine
 "For the Future" (The Owl House), a 2023 television episode